Paso Pehuenche is an Andean mountain pass and international border crossing between Chile and Argentina. It connects Talca and San Clemente in Chile with Malargüe in Argentina.

Sources

PASO PEHUENCHE- COMPLEJO FRONTERIZO PEHUENCHE

Mountain passes of Chile
Mountain passes of Argentina
Mountain passes of the Andes
Landforms of Maule Region
Landforms of Mendoza Province
Landforms of Neuquén Province
Argentina–Chile border crossings
Transport in Maule Region